Taichung City Bus ( or so called ) is managed by the Transportation Bureau, Taichung City Government in Taichung City, Taiwan. This includes bus routes 1–989 which are operated by different bus companies. There're currently 275 bus routes, covering every districts. The main part of the network provides bus service in downtown area, some other routes connect different districts, and the others serve residents in rural or remote area.

Fares
The fares are calculated by mileage per ride. The basic fare is NT$20 for 10 km, and the extended fare is NT$2.431*(1+5% tax included) per km and round to the nearest integer.

From 1 June 2011 to 30 June 2015, taking buses whose route numbers are under 300 with any of four sorts of electronic tickets (including EasyCard (悠遊卡)and  I Pass (一卡通), could benefit from a free ride below 8 kilometers. From July 1, 2015, the same benefit extended from 8 km to 10 km, and the range of route numbers are no longer under 300.
On Jan. 1, 2021 discounts become limited to Taichung citizens, students whose study is in Taichung, and spouse of non Taiwanese citizen such as other countries, Mainland China, Hong Kong and Macau whose marriage is with a Taichung resident.
Promotion for students who study in Taichung will become unavailable when they graduated.

Operators

Former Operators

See also
List of bus routes in Taichung
Transportation in Taichung

References

External links
Taichung Dynamic Bus Information & Transit System

1958 establishments in Taiwan
Bus transportation in Taiwan
Transportation in Taichung